Ratan Thiyam (born 20 January 1948) is an Indian playwright and theatre director, and the winner of Sangeet Natak Akademi Award in 1987, one of leading figures of the "theatre of roots" movement in Indian theatre, which started in the 1970s. Also known as Thiyam Nemai, Ratan Thiyam is known for writing and staging plays that use ancient Indian theatre traditions and forms in a contemporary context. A former painter, and proficient in direction, design, script and music, Thiyam is often considered one of leading contemporary theatre gurus.<ref>Theater in Review – 'Nine Hills One Valley' by Jason Zinoman, New York Times, 14 October 2006.</ref>

He worked as Chairperson of the prestigious National School of Drama from 2013-2017. He had also worked as Vice-Chairman of Sangeet Natak Akademi before joining NSD. He has also worked as Director of National School of Drama from 1987 to 1989. He is also the founder-director of Chorus Repertory Theatre, formed on the outskirts of Imphal, Manipur in 1976. He was awarded the Sangeet Natak Akademi Award in Direction in 1987, given by Sangeet Natak Akademi, India's National Academy for Music, Dance and Drama, and the Padma Shri given by Government of India in 1989. He was awarded the 2012 Sangeet Natak Akademi Fellowship, the highest honour in the performing arts conferred by the Sangeet Natak Akademi, India's National Academy for Music, Dance and Drama. In the year 2013, Ratan Thiyam receives honorary D.lit from Assam University, Silchar.

Early life and education
Ratan Thiyam graduated from National School of Drama, New Delhi in 1974.

Career

He went on to set up a theatre group called Chorus Repertory Theatre in Imphal, Manipur in 1976. He was also briefly the director of National School of Drama (NSD), New Delhi (1987–88).

His production of Ajneya's Uttar Priyadarshi in Meitei was staged at the 1st Bharat Rang Mahotsav (BRM), the annual theatre festival of National School of Drama (NSD), Delhi in 1999, his presentation of Kalidasa's epic poem Ritusamharam was closing production of 4th BRM in 2002, subsequently the 10th BRM in 2008, which also marked the golden jubilee of NSD, opened at Kamani Auditorium, New Delhi, with a performance was Prologue, the first part of his Manipur Trilogy, when all past alumni has gathered for the festival. The 12th BRM in January 2010 featured Ratan Thiyam's  When we Dead Awaken.

The plays of Ratan Thiyam
His works profess a deep concern for social welfare and spiritual yearnings in the midst of the political chaos in the modern world. His plays infuse rationalised and multifaceted analysis of myriad perspectives. Using ingenious theatrical stagecraft, his plays are tinged with literary beauty and meaning. Most of Ratan Thiyam's plays are thematically Indianised and are profound plays with universal appeal.

His works are strongly influenced by Natya Sastra, an Indian theatre style propounded by Bharata during the second century B.C., as also ancient Greek drama, and the Noh theatre of Japan. His approach to theatre has been shaped by years of study under the tutelage of several major exponents of the traditional Meitei performing arts. Thiyam is also known for his use of traditional martial arts, of Thang-Ta in his plays, such as in Urubhangam (Broken Thigh), of Sanskrit playwright Bhāsa itself based on an episode from epic, the Mahabharata, which along with Chakravyuh (Army Formation) is considered one of his finest works. In 1986, he adapted Jean Anouilh's "Antigone" as Lengshonnei, a comment on the personal behaviour of politicians, failing to handle political situation in the state. Uttar Priyadarshi (The Final Beatitude), an adaptation of Hindi verse play by playwright and poet Agyeya in 1996, based on a story of redemption of King Ashoka, a man's struggle against his own inner dark side and a plea for peace, knowing its impact on future generation. The play has since travelled to many parts of the South Asia, Australia and the US.

His play Andha Yug (The Blind Age), known for creating an intense and intimate experience, around the epochal theme, was famously staged in an open-air performance, at Tonga, Japan, on 5 August 1994, a day before the forty-ninth anniversary of Atomic Holocaust in Hiroshima.

His major plays include Ritusamharam: The work seeks solace and sanity amidst chaos and violence of today's world.

In 2014, Thiyam opened a Manipuri adaptation of Macbeth, translocated to a historical Meitei context, with names of characters unchanged. It was the opening act at the 2019 inaugural Bangladesh International Theatre Festival.

List of plays

 Karanabharam (1979) (Karna-bhara: Karna's burden by Sanskrit playwright Bhasa)
 Imphal Imphal (1982)
 Chakravyuha (1984) (Army Formation)
 Lengshonnei (1986) (An adaptation of Jean Anouilh's Antigone)
 Uttar Priyadarshi (The Final Beatitude, by Hindi playwright Agyeya) (1996)
 Chinglon Mapan Tampak Ama (Nine Hills One Valley)
 Ritusamharam (Ritusamharam by Sanskrit playwright Kalidasa)
 Andha Yug (The Blind Age, by Hindi playwright Dharamvir Bharati)
 Wahoudok (Prologue)
 Ashibagee Eshei (based on When We Dead Awaken, by Norwegian playwright Henrik Ibsen) (2008)Another play by Ratan Thiyam, another astonishing splash. The Telegraph, 6 March 2009.
 Lairembigee Eshei (Song of the Nymphs) 
 The King of Dark Chamber (Raja, 2012), based on a play Raja (1910) by Rabindranath Tagore.

Awards
 1984: Indo-Greek Friendship Award, 1984 (Greece)
 1987: Sangeet Natak Akademi Award
 1987: Fringe Firsts Award, from Edinburgh International Festival 
 1989: Padma Shri
 1990: Diploma of Cervantino International Festival, (Mexico)
 2005: Kalidas Samman
 2008: John D. Rockefeller Award
 2011: Bharat Muni Samman
 2012: Sangeet Natak Akademi Fellowship (Akademi Ratna)
 2013: Bhupen Hazarika Foundation Award

In popular cultureSome Roots Grow Upwards'' a 2003 documentary by Kavita Joshi and Malati Rao, was based on the life and work of Ratan Thiyam, especially his political ideologies, and his use of theatre as medium of political protest.

References

External links

 Chorus Repertory Theatre Official website
 Profile at Manipur Online

Indian theatre directors
Indian male dramatists and playwrights
1948 births
Living people
Dramatists and playwrights from Manipur
Meitei people
Indian scenic designers
Indian drama teachers
Recipients of the Sangeet Natak Akademi Award
National School of Drama alumni
Academic staff of the National School of Drama
Recipients of the Padma Shri in arts
Indian arts administrators
Recipients of the Sangeet Natak Akademi Fellowship
20th-century Indian designers
20th-century Indian dramatists and playwrights
20th-century Indian male writers